The High Windows (HaHalonot HaGvohim) was a 1960s Israeli pop group founded by Arik Einstein, Shmulik Kraus and Josie Katz.

History 
Hahalonot HaGvohim trio was formed at the end of 1966. As composer and vocal arranger, Kraus was the group's moving spirit. The group's debut album, which came out in April 1967, six weeks before the Six-Day War, signaled a new direction in local rock and pop.

The band remained together for only one year. When Einstein left in the wake of a disagreement, Kraus and Josie Katz, then his wife, tried to build up a career in London, but without success.

The band recorded pop music that was very light and catchy. Their songs, which went on to become Israeli classics, include Einech Yechola (You Can't), Kol HaShavua Lach (The Whole Week for You), Ahava Rishona (First Love), Yehezkel (Ezekiel), Chayal Shel Shokolad (Chocolate Soldier), Kama Naim (How Pleasant) and more.

Zemer Nugeh (A Sad Song), based on a poem by the Hebrew poet Rachel was played by Ilan Ramon in space, and is one of the songs now associated with him.

Band members 
 Arik Einstein – Vocals
 Shmulik Kraus – Guitars, Vocals
 Josie Katz – Vocals

Discography 
 The High Windows (1967)

References

External links 
  Zemer Nugeh'' (A Sad Song) – Live performance in Olympia, Paris – 1968
  Einech Yechola'' (You Can't) – 1967

Israeli pop music groups
Musical groups established in 1966
1966 establishments in Israel